The Arizona Romeo is a 1925 American silent Western film directed by Edmund Mortimer and starring Buck Jones, Lucy Fox, and Bud Geary.

Plot
As described in a review in a film magazine, the more violent the opposition on the part of her father John Wayne (Kirkland), the more determined is Sylvia (Fox) to marry Richard Barr (Geary) even though she does not really love him. She slips away with her maid and arranges for John to meet her in Arizona. Tom Long is disgusted to find that his cowboys are all getting manicures, and that Sylvia and her maid are responsible, posing as manicurists in a local shop. In seeking to save Sylvia from the attentions of a tough guy, he loses his heart to her. Richard appears on the scene and Sylvia tells Tom why she came to Arizona. Tom agrees to help her and leads the sheriff (Clark) off the track by posing as Richard. Sylvia and Richard make a getaway on the train. Sylvia's father reveals that his opposition to the marriage was a ruse, knowing that she would always be more determined to do the opposite of anything he recommended. Tom rides after the train, takes Sylvia off, and she readily agrees to marry him.

Cast

Preservation
With no prints of The Arizona Romeo located in any film archives, it is a lost film.

References

Bibliography
 Solomon, Aubrey. The Fox Film Corporation, 1915-1935: A History and Filmography. McFarland, 2011.

External links
 
 
 Still at gettyimages.com

1925 films
1925 Western (genre) films
Films directed by Edmund Mortimer
Fox Film films
American black-and-white films
Silent American Western (genre) films
1920s English-language films
1920s American films